In 1926, the Ministry of Finance introduced notes for the Republic of Turkey in denominations of TL 1, TL 5, TL 10, TL 50, TL 100, TL 500 and TL 1,000. These were the last notes printed with both French and Turkish (in the Arabic script) texts on them. The TL 50, TL 100, TL 500 and TL 1,000 notes carried the portrait of Mustafa Kemal Atatürk.

Between 1937 and 1939, the Central Bank of Turkey introduced new notes with Turkish texts in the Latin alphabet, again depicting Atatürk. this time on all denominations. After Atatürk's death the same design was recycled with İsmet İnönü replacing Atatürk's image. Denominations of TL 2½, TL 5, TL 10, TL 50, TL 100, TL 500 and TL 1,000 were issued. TL 1 notes were reintroduced in 1942, followed by 50 kuruş (TL 0.5) notes in 1944. These two lowest denominations were replaced by coins after the War.

Atatürk reappeared on a subsequent series of notes in the early 1950s. The TL 2½ notes were replaced by coins in 1960, with the same happening to the TL 5 and TL 10 notes in 1974 and 1981. Higher denomination notes were introduced during the 1980s and 90s: TL 5,000 in 1981, TL 10,000 in 1982, TL 20,000 in 1988, TL 50,000 in 1989, TL 100,000 in 1991, TL 250,000 in 1992, TL 500,000 in 1993, TL 1,000,000 in 1995, TL 5,000,000 in 1997, TL 10,000,000 in 1999 and TL 20,000,000 in 2001. The higher values of the "E7 Emission Group" banknotes (1992 TL 250,000 and later and higher value notes) were exchangeable for new lira at a rate of TL 1,000,000 to ₺1 at branches of the Central Bank of the Republic of Turkey until 31 December 2015, after which time they became worthless. The TL 50,000 note ceased to be redeemable on 4 November 2009, and the TL 100,000 note on 4 November 2011.

The First Issue (E1) Banknotes

The Second Issue (E2) Banknotes

The Third Issue (E3) Banknotes

The Fourth Issue (E4) Banknotes

The Fifth Issue (E5) Banknotes

The Sixth Issue (E6) Banknotes

The Seventh Issue (E7) Banknotes
The notes were given security features. The later versions of the TL 100,000, TL 250,000, TL 500,000 and TL 1,000,000 notes lost their colour-changing ink due to inflation.

The Eighth Issue (E8) Banknotes
In the transitional period between 1 January 2005 and 31 December 2008, the second Turkish lira was officially called "new Turkish lira" (abbr: YTL) in Turkey. Banknotes, referred to by the Central Bank as the "E-8 Emission Group", were introduced in 2005 in denominations of YTL 1, YTL 5, YTL 10, YTL 20, YTL 50, and YTL 100. Whilst the lower four denominations replaced older notes and used very similar designs, the YTL 50 and YTL 100 notes did not have equivalents in the old currency. All notes depict Mustafa Kemal Atatürk from different points of his life and images of various historical and otherwise important buildings and places in Turkey.

The Ninth Issue (E9) Banknotes 
A new series of banknotes, the "E-9 Emission Group" entered circulation on 1 January 2009, with the E-8 group ceasing to be valid after 31 December 2009 (although still redeemable at branches of the Central Bank until 31 December 2019). The E-9 banknotes refer to the currency as "Turkish lira" rather than "new Turkish lira", and include a new ₺200 denomination. The new banknotes have different sizes to prevent forgery. The main specificity of this new series is that each denomination depicts a famous Turkish personality, rather than geographical sites and architectural features of Turkey. The dominant colour of the ₺5 banknote has been determined as “purple” on the second series of the current banknotes.

See also
 Turkish lira
 Economy of Turkey
 Economy of the Turkish Republic of Northern Cyprus
 Coins of Turkey

References

External links 
 Central Bank of the Republic of Turkey
 Catalog of Banknotes of Turkey